Roth may refer to:

Places

Germany
 Roth (district), in Bavaria, Germany
 Roth, Bavaria, capital of that district
Roth (electoral district), a federal electoral district
 Rhineland-Palatinate, Germany:
 Roth an der Our, in the district Bitburg-Prüm
 Roth bei Prüm, in the district Bitburg-Prüm
 Roth, Altenkirchen, in the district of Altenkirchen
 Roth, Bad Kreuznach, in the district of Bad Kreuznach
 Roth, Rhein-Hunsrück, in the district Rhein-Hunsrück
 Roth, Rhein-Lahn, in the district Rhein-Lahn-Kreis

France
 Roth, Moselle, a village in the commune of Hambach, Moselle

United States
 Roth, Illinois, a community
 Roth, North Dakota, a community
 Roth, Virginia, a community

Rivers 
 Roth (Danube), a river of Bavaria, Germany, tributary of the Danube
 Roth (Rednitz), a river of Bavaria, Germany, tributary of the Rednitz
 Roth (Zusam), a river of Bavaria, Germany, tributary of the Zusam
 Rot (Apfelstädt), a river also called Roth, of Thuringia, Germany, tributary of the Apfelstädt

People 
 Roth (surname)
 Roth, formal botanical abbreviation for Albrecht Wilhelm Roth (1757–1834), German physician and botanist

Fictional characters 
 Cooper Roth, Marvel Comics superhero
 Hyman Roth, fictional character in the film The Godfather Part II
Margo Roth Spiegelman, a prominent character in YA novel Paper Towns
 Rachel Roth, alias for DC Comics superhero Raven

Other uses 
 Challenge Roth, a long-distance triathlon race
 Daniel Roth (watchmakers), watch making company
 Roth IRA or Roth 401(k), tax-advantaged retirement savings accounts in the U.S.

Acronyms 
 Realms of the Haunting, computer game

See also 
 Rothe